Capistrello is a comune and town in the province of L'Aquila in the Abruzzo region of central-southern Italy. It is located at the border between the upper Liri River valley and the Marsica. Capistrello borders the following municipalities: Avezzano, Canistro, Castellafiume, Filettino (Frosinone), Luco dei Marsi, Scurcola Marsicana and Tagliacozzo.

See also
 Capistrello massacre
 Tunnels of Claudius

References

Cunicoli di Claudio

Marsica
Capistrello